The Oulton Raidettes Women's Rugby League Club are an England professional Women's rugby league football team based in Leeds, West Yorkshire, founded in 2012.  Oulton Raidettes have Affiliations with the Oulton Raiders and they play in the RFL Women's Rugby League.

See also

Women's rugby league

References

External links

Women's rugby league teams in England
Rugby clubs established in 2012
2012 establishments in England
Rugby league teams in West Yorkshire